Hey U X is the debut studio album by New Zealand singer-songwriter Benee, released on 13 November 2020 by Republic Records. 

Hey U X was primarily written by Benee and frequent collaborator Josh Fountain, who also executive produced the record. It features guest appearances from Grimes, Lily Allen, Flo Milli, Gus Dapperton, Mallrat and Bakar. 

Supported by four singles—"Night Garden", "Snail", "Plain", and "Kool",—Hey U X debuted and peaked at number two on the NZ Albums Chart and number twenty-two on the ARIA Albums Chart. The album received generally positive reviews from critics, with Radio New Zealand listing it among their best albums of 2020.

Background and release 
Benee told Billboard that she would be releasing an album in 2020, before formally announcing the release of Hey U X on 15 October 2020. She had revealed prior to this that it would differ musically from her existing repertoire, telling Uproxx:

On the namesake, she told The New Zealand Herald, "'Hey u x' was something that was something that I thought was cute. I feel like there's never a word that sums up the whole thing… I try to just find something that's completely relevant." The album track "All the Time" features Raglan-based musician Muroki who became the first signee to Benee's record label, Olive, which she established in early October 2020. Shortly after the announcement of Olive, Benee embarked on a national headlining arena tour of New Zealand after the country had reported no cases of COVID-19. She performed eight shows across four cities, with the final show at Spark Arena selling out all 12,000 seats and becoming the first sold-out concert at the venue to be livestreamed to ticketholders.

Composition 

Benee revealed to Uproxx that the album "infus[es] elements of 'hardcore' electronic [music] with trap-style beats".

Singles
"Night Garden" featuring British musician Bakar and American producer Kenny Beats was released on 15 July 2020 as the album's official lead single. "Snail" was released on 10 August 2020 and served the album's second single. Both "Night Garden" and "Snail" received music videos to support their release. "Plain" was released on 27 October 2020 as the third single, but did not receive a music video to support its release. "Kool" was released as the fourth single from the album, along with a music video.

Hey U X also includes the song "Supalonely" featuring Gus Dapperton, which served as the third single from the 2019 EP Stella & Steve, and achieved mainstream international success following its popularization on the social media platform TikTok in early 2020.

Critical reception

Hey U X received mostly positive reviews. At Metacritic, which assigns a normalised score out of 100 to ratings from publications, the album received an average score of 78 based on 10 reviews, indicating "generally favorable reviews". Radio New Zealand ranked the album at number 16 on their list of the 20 best albums of 2020.

Track listing

Charts

References

2020 debut albums
Benee albums
Albums produced by Josh Fountain
Republic Records albums